Gajanan Kirtikar is Leader of Shivsena and a Member of Parliament (MP) from Mumbai North West (Lok Sabha constituency) in Mumbai, Maharashtra, India. He has been a Member of Legislative Assembly from Malad assembly constituency in Mumbai from 1990 to 2009. He was state minister for home in Shiv Sena-Bharatiya Janata Party Government.

He has been elected to the Parliament of India. In the 2014 General elections (16th Lok Sabha), he defeated Gurudas Kamat, by a margin of approximately 1,83,000 votes, to win from the Mumbai North West constituency in Maharashtra.

Positions held
 1990: Elected to Maharashtra Legislative Assembly (1st term) 
 1995: Re-elected to Maharashtra Legislative Assembly (2nd term)
 1995-98 : Minister of State for Home, Tourism, Maharashtra
 1998-99 : Cabinet Minister for Information, Public Relations and Transport, Maharashtra State
 1999: Re-elected to Maharashtra Legislative Assembly (3rd term) 
 2004: Re-elected to Maharashtra Legislative Assembly (4th term)
 2006: President, Sthaniy Lokadhikar Samiti Mahasangha
 2007 Onwards: Leader, Shiv Sena 
 2010: President, Mumbai Upnagar Kabaddi Association
 2014: Elected to 16th Lok Sabha
 2019: Elected to 17th Lok Sabha

See also
 Manohar Joshi ministry
 Narayan Rane ministry

References

External links
 Shiv Sena official website 
 Gajanan Kirtikar Lok Sabha Profile
 Shiv Sena fields new faces from Mumbai
 Cong, NCP repose faith in sitting MPs in Mumbai
 मराठी मते यावेळी विभागणार नाहीत – गजानन कीर्तिकर

Shiv Sena politicians
Living people
Maharashtra MLAs 2004–2009
1943 births
India MPs 2014–2019
State cabinet ministers of Maharashtra
Lok Sabha members from Maharashtra
Marathi politicians
India MPs 2019–present